The Duet technical routine competition of the Synchronised swimming events at the 2011 World Aquatics Championships was held on July 17 with the preliminary round and the final on July 18.

Medalists

Results

The preliminary round was held at 14:00 local time. The final was held at 19:15 on the following day.

Green denotes finalists

References

External links
2011 World Aquatics Championships: Duet technical routine start list, from OmegaTiming.com; retrieved 2011-07-16.

Duet technical routines